The Pinch Hitter is a 1917 American silent comedy drama film directed by Victor Schertzinger and starring Charles Ray. It was produced by Thomas H. Ince and released by Triangle Film Corporation.

The film was remade in 1925 starring Glenn Hunter under the same name.

Cast
Charles Ray as Joel Parker
Sylvia Breamer as Abbie Nettleton
Joseph J. Dowling as Obediah Parker
Jerome Storm as Jimmie Slater
Darrel Foss as Alexis Thompson
Louis Durham as Coach Nolan

Preservation status
George Eastman House, the Library of Congress, and the UCLA Film and Television Archive hold copies of the film.

References

External links

1917 films
American silent feature films
Films directed by Victor Schertzinger
Triangle Film Corporation films
American black-and-white films
1910s English-language films
1917 comedy-drama films
1910s American films
Silent American comedy-drama films